Osiedle Przydworcowe is one of the districts of the Polish city of Białystok.

External links

Przydworcowe